The Gun-Free School Zones Act (GFSZA) is an act of the U.S. Congress prohibiting any unauthorized individual from knowingly possessing a loaded or unsecured firearm at a place that the individual knows, or has reasonable cause to believe, is a school zone as defined by .  The law applies to public, private, and parochial elementary schools and high schools, and to non-private property within  feet of them.  It provides that the states and their political subdivisions may issue licenses that exempt the licensed individuals from the prohibition.

It was first introduced in the U.S. Senate in February 1990 as S. 2070 by Senator Herb Kohl of Wisconsin and then was incorporated into the Crime Control Act of 1990 that was signed into law by President George H. W. Bush. Following a 1995 Supreme Court ruling, United States v. Lopez, which struck down the original law, the Gun-Free Schools Act of 1990 was amended so prosecution would only occur for crimes involving guns linked to either interstate or foreign commerce.

History
The Gun-Free School Zones Act of 1990 was originally passed as section 1702 of the Crime Control Act of 1990. It added ;  itself was added by the Omnibus Crime Control and Safe Streets Act of 1968.

The Supreme Court of the United States subsequently held that the Act was an unconstitutional exercise of Congressional authority under the Commerce Clause of the United States Constitution in United States v. Lopez, 514 U.S. 549 (1995). This was the first time in over half a century that the Supreme Court limited Congressional authority to legislate under the Commerce Clause.

Following the Lopez decision, U.S. Attorney General Janet Reno proposed changes to  that were adopted in section 657 of the Omnibus Consolidated Appropriations Act of 1997, . These changes required that the firearm in question "has moved in or otherwise affects interstate commerce." As nearly all firearms have moved in interstate commerce at some point in their existence, critics assert this was merely a legislative tactic to circumvent the Supreme Court's ruling.

Challenges
The Supreme Court of the United States held that the original Act was an unconstitutional exercise of Congressional authority under the Commerce Clause of the United States Constitution in United States v. Lopez, 514 U.S. 549 (1995). This was the first time in over half a century that the Supreme Court limited Congressional authority to legislate under the Commerce Clause.

Although the amended GFSZA has yet to be challenged in the U.S. Supreme Court, it has been reviewed and upheld by several federal Circuit Courts. In a 2005 Appellate case, United States v. Dorsey, the minor changes of the revised law were specifically challenged. In Dorsey, the U.S. Court of Appeals for the Ninth Circuit ruled that the minor changes were indeed sufficient to correct the issues that had caused the original 1990 law to be struck down in Lopez, and they upheld Dorsey's conviction under the revised version of the law. A 2000 ruling made by the Eleventh Circuit in United States v. Tait overturned a conviction for firearm possession in a school zone because the defendant was licensed to do so by the state in which the school zone is located.

Convictions upheld post-Lopez under the revised Gun Free School Zones Act include:

United States v. Danks (Eighth Circuit 1999)
United States v. Smith (Sixth Circuit 2005)
United States v. Dorsey (Ninth Circuit 2005)
United States v. Nieves-Castaño (First Circuit 2007)
United States v. Weekes (Third Circuit 2007)
United States v. Benally (Tenth Circuit 2007)
United States v. Cruz-Rodriguez (First Circuit 2008)

Convictions overturned post-Lopez under the revised Gun Free School Zones Act include:

United States v. Tait (Eleventh Circuit 2000)
United States v. Haywood (Third Circuit 2002)
United States v. Guzman-Montanez (First Circuit 2014)

Provisions

 states:

It shall be unlawful for any individual knowingly to possess a firearm that has moved in or that otherwise affects interstate or foreign commerce at a place that the individual knows, or has reasonable cause to believe, is a school zone.
 states:

Except as provided in subparagraph (B), it shall be unlawful for any person, knowingly or with reckless disregard for the safety of another, to discharge or attempt to discharge a firearm that has moved in or that otherwise affects interstate or foreign commerce at a place that the person knows is a school zone.

Exceptions
Pursuant to :

Definitions
Pursuant to :

Pursuant to  the term "school" means a school which provides elementary or secondary education, as determined under state law.

Penalty
 establishes the penalty for violating GFSZA:

Whoever violates the Act shall be fined not more than $5,000, imprisoned for not more than 5 years, or both.  Notwithstanding any other provision of law, the term of imprisonment imposed under this paragraph shall not run concurrently with any other term of imprisonment imposed under any other provision of law.

A conviction under the GFSZA will cause an individual to become a "prohibited person" under the Gun Control Act of 1968. It is unlawful for a "prohibited person" to own, purchase, or possess "firearms" as defined by US federal law. A US presidential pardon may remove this civil disability.

Legal effects

Places affected

Individuals traveling on public sidewalks, roads, and highways within  of defined schools are subject to the law's legal restrictions. The First Circuit Court of Appeals sustained a GFSZA conviction in the 2007 case of United States v Nieves-Castaño for a firearm kept in a woman's apartment, which was part of a public housing project within 1,000 feet of a school. In 2012, ATF informed the town of Stratham, New Hampshire, that hunters would be violating GFSZA by hunting on locally approved public hunting land, a town forest, which fell within 1,000 feet of a local school.

Carrying
Most states allow some form of unlicensed carry by persons who are not prohibited by statute from owning or possessing firearms. This may be open-carry, vehicle-carry, or concealed carry without the need for a permit. The Federal GFSZA prohibits unlicensed carry by making it a federal crime for an unlicensed individual to travel into a "Gun Free School Zone unless they meet one of the other criteria defined in Section 'B'."   The large number of K-12 schools in developed areas makes it difficult for an individual to travel any distance without entering a Gun Free School Zone.

Although the federal GFSZA does provide an exception for an individual licensed to carry a firearm, this exception only applies in the state that physically issued the permit.  Nearly all 50 states have provisions to issue concealed carry permits to citizens.  Most of these states also enter into reciprocity agreements with other states where each state agrees to recognize the other's concealed carry permits.  Because the Federal GFSZA requires the permit be issued by the state which the school zone is in, it is difficult for a permit holder to travel outside their state of issuance to a reciprocating state without violating the Federal GFSZA.

The Law Enforcement Officers Safety Act (LEOSA), intended to allow qualified law enforcement officers the ability to carry guns nationwide, does not provide any exceptions to Federal Law per . GFSZA does not make any exception for an off-duty qualified officer.

Discharge

GFSZA generally prohibits anyone from discharging a firearm on public property within a school zone. Legal exceptions are made for on-duty law enforcement and contracted school security.

Reactions

Amendments introduced
In June 1995, following restrictions which were placed on the original law in the United States v. Lopez Supreme Court ruling, The Gun-Free Schools of 1990 was replaced by The Gun-Free School Zones Act of 1995. The new law restored much of the language of the original law, but also added a new provision which requires prosecutors to prove during each prosecution that the gun moved in or affected interstate or foreign commerce.

Opposing the law
No form of those bills has ever passed committee.

In February 2018, US Representative Thomas Massie introduced a similar bill,  titled the "Safe Students Act", that would repeal the Federal Gun Free School Zones Act.

See also
Gun law in the United States
Gun politics in the United States

References

External links
Bill Summary & Status 101st Congress (1989–1990) S.3266 

101st United States Congress
Gun politics in the United States
United States federal criminal legislation
United States federal firearms legislation